Celestia is a free astronomy computer program.

Celestia may also refer to:

Games
 Mount Celestia, a fictional place in the Dungeons & Dragons role-playing game
 Celestia, a planet in Eternia in Tales of Eternia, a Namco video game
 Celestia, a world in Disgaea: Hour of Darkness

Other
 Celestia (name), a person's given name
 Celestia (band), a black metal band from Avignon, France
 1252 Celestia, a Main-belt asteroid
 Nation of Celestial Space aka Celestia, a micronation created by James Thomas Mangan
 Celestia, an Adventist Christian commune established near Laporte, Pennsylvania in the mid-19th century
 Princess Celestia (voiced by Nicole Oliver), a character in the TV show My Little Pony: Friendship Is Magic

See also
 Celesta
 Celestial (disambiguation)